Antigua Recreation Ground is the national stadium of Antigua and Barbuda. It is located in St. John's, on the island of Antigua. The ground has been used by the West Indies cricket team and Antigua and Barbuda national football team. It had Test cricket status. It was also known as the Old Recreation Ground, or the Old Rec.
against England in the "Blackwash" series of 1986 at the Recreation Ground. It was also where Brian Lara twice set the record for highest individual Test innings, scoring 375 in 1994 and the current record of 400 not out in 2004, both times against England.

In May 2003 the West Indies completed the highest ever successful run chase in Test Cricket at the ARG, making 418/7 against Australia in their fourth innings to win by 3 wickets.

Antigua is considered to be a good wicket on which to bat – hard and dry whilst not offering much bounce or movement to bowlers. This is colloquially known as a "featherbed".

After the building of the Sir Vivian Richards Stadium for the 2007 World Cup, no further Test cricket was expected at the Recreation Ground.  However, due to the abandonment of the Second Test between West Indies v England on 13 February 2009 after just ten balls (due to an unfit outfield), an extra Test, called the Third Test, began at the Antigua Recreation Ground on 15 February 2009, despite concerns about the dilapidated condition of the stadium.

Like many other cricket grounds in the Caribbean, the Antigua Recreation Ground traditionally hosts a variety of off the field entertainment, particularly music, both live and recorded, during breaks in play. For many years, an entertainer called Gravy would operate in the stands, usually in fancy dress.

List of five-wicket hauls
A total of 16 five-wicket hauls were taken in Test matches on the ground.

See also

Cricket
2007 Cricket World Cup
List of Test cricket grounds
Stanford Cricket Ground
Sir Vivian Richards Stadium

Notes

References

Sports venues in Antigua and Barbuda
Buildings and structures in St. John's, Antigua and Barbuda
Antigua
Sport in St. John's, Antigua and Barbuda
Cricket grounds in Antigua and Barbuda
Test cricket grounds in the West Indies
Football venues in Antigua and Barbuda
Sports venues completed in 1978
1978 establishments in the British Empire